The Sound of The Smiths is a Smiths compilation released on 10 November 2008. It is available as both single and double disc editions. Morrissey is credited with having coined the compilation's title, while Johnny Marr was involved in the project's mastering. Early promotional material for the album originally saw it entitled Hang the DJ: The Very Best of the Smiths, but this was changed for the final release.

The album charted No. 21 in the UK Album Charts and No. 98 on the Billboard Album Charts. The pictures on the covers of the original and deluxe editions were taken by Tom Sheehan. It’s the only album featuring the band members on the artwork.

Track listing

CD 1

 The iTunes release of the deluxe edition includes the bonus tracks "Rubber Ring" (as track 14) and "The Draize Train" (as track 18) on CD 1.
 Additionally, the iTunes edition of the single-disc version includes "What She Said" (as track 10) as a bonus track plus "Hand in Glove" (Live at Brixton Ace 29/6/83) (as track 25).
 "You Just Haven't Earned It Yet, Baby" is a slightly slower version than previously issued. According to an interview posted on Johnny Marr's homepage with mastering engineer Frank Arkwright, "[W]e removed the varispeed from the original release which I thought was too fast ..."

CD 2: Deluxe Edition

Certifications

References

External links
 

2008 compilation albums
Albums produced by Stephen Street
The Smiths compilation albums
Albums produced by John Porter (musician)
Albums produced by Dale Griffin
Rhino Records compilation albums